Espadon (swordfish in French) may refer to:
 Ecurie Espadon, a formula one team
 French ship Espadon, three French submarines
 Sud-Ouest Espadon, a late 1940s experimental French jet interceptor aircraft